Krångede Hydroelectric Power Station is a run-of-the-river hydroelectric power plant on the Indalsälven in Jämtland County, Sweden. About 15 km downstream of Krångede is the urban area Hammarstrand.

Work on the power plant began in 1931. It was operational in 1936. Krångede power plant is owned by Fortum.

Dam
Krångede Dam is a concrete gravity dam. The dam features a spillway with 4 gates over the dam, that is located in the middle.

Power plant 
The power plant contains 6 Francis turbine-generators. The total nameplate capacity is 248.4 MW. Its average annual generation is 1622.4 GWh. The hydraulic head is 60 m.

See also

 List of hydroelectric power stations in Sweden

External links

References

Dams in Sweden
Hydroelectric power stations in Sweden
Gravity dams
Dams completed in 1936
Energy infrastructure completed in 1936
1936 establishments in Sweden